The Adiyogi statue is a ,  and  steel statue of Shiva with Thirunamam at Coimbatore, Tamil Nadu. It is recognized by the Guinness World Records as the "Largest Bust Sculpture” in the world.

Adiyogi refers to Shiva (Shankara) as the first yogi. It was established to inspire people towards inner well-being through yoga.

Description 

Adiyogi is located at the Isha Yoga Center. Its height, 112 ft, symbolizes the 112 possibilities to attain to moksha (liberation) that are mentioned in yogic culture, and also the 112 chakras in the human system. A linga called Yogeshwar Linga was consecrated and placed in front of the statue. The Indian Ministry of Tourism has included the statue in its official Incredible India campaign. It is also the venue of a light and sound show on Shiva as a yogi, inaugurated by the President of India, Ram Nath Kovind.

Inauguration 
Adiyogi was inaugurated on 24 February 2017 by the Prime Minister of India, Narendra Modi, on the occasion of Maha Shivaratri. He also launched a companion book, Adiyogi: The Source of Yoga, written by Sadhguru. To mark the unveiling of the statue, the song "Adiyogi – The Source of Yoga" was released by the Isha Foundation, sung by Kailash Kher, with lyrics by Prasoon Joshi.

Another  statue of Adiyogi was unveiled in Tennessee, US in 2015 by the Isha Foundation, as part of a  yoga studio.

Adiyogi Divya Darshanam 
Adiyogi Divya Darshanam is 3D laser show, narrating story of Adiyogi and how the science of yoga was given to human beings. It was inaugurated by President Ram Nath Kovind on Mahashivratri in 2019. It is a 14 minute light and sound show, projected upon the Adiyogi Statue.

In 2020, it won the Mondo*dr EMEA & APAC Award for Technology in Entertainment in the House of Worship category.

Adiyogi Divya Darshanam happening Daily at 7 PM IST.

Other Adiyogi Shiva statues 
In January, 2014, Sadhguru Jaggi Vasudev announced his desire to put Adiyogi Shiva statues in 4 Corners of India which will perhaps be coming up in a few years.

A 112-Feet Adiyogi Shiva Statue at Chikkaballapur  was inaugurated on 15th Jan 2023.The statue is set up along with eight Navagraha temples along with Bhairavi Temple at the Isha Yoga Centre at Chikkaballapur, Karnataka.

On August 30, 2022, Sadhguru Jaggi Vasudev visited Pura Mahadev, Baghpat. Isha foundation desired to get land on lease for Sanskrit School, Yoga Centre and 68 m (242 ft) Adiyogi Shiva statue. The statue will be built near the banks of Hindon River located near Pura Mahadev (पुरा महादेव) and Hariya Kheda, Uttar Pradesh.

See also 

 List of the tallest statues in India
 List of tallest statues in the world
 List of tallest freestanding structures
 List of colossal sculpture in situ
 New Seven Wonders of the World
 List of statues

References

External links 

 

Buildings and structures in Coimbatore
Busts (sculpture)
Forms of Shiva
Sculptures of gods
Shiva in art
Colossal statues in India
Tourist attractions in Coimbatore
2017 sculptures
2017 establishments in Tamil Nadu
Moon in art
Statues